Bernard S. Garrett Sr. (September 19, 1925 – September 9, 1999) was an American businessman, investor and banker.

Early life and education
Garrett was born on September 19, 1925 in Willis, Texas. He completed 11th grade in Houston, Texas, and married his first wife, Eunice.  They moved to Inglewood, California, and in 1958, Eunice gave birth to their son, Bernard Garrett Jr.  They subsequently separated and divorced in 1959. Bernard met Linda Marie Guillemette in 1960 and in 1962, they were married. By 1963, Bernard and Linda had acquired a wealth of real estate holdings all over California, including the prestigious Bankers Building in downtown Los Angeles, which they purchased that same year. They joined in Martin Luther King Jr.'s August 1963 March on Washington for Jobs and Freedom.

Career
Garrett started and ran a cleaning business in Texas. In 1945, the family moved to California where Garrett started another cleaning business and a wastepaper collection business.

When Garrett wanted to buy an apartment building in a white neighborhood in Los Angeles, he worked out a deal with the owner, Mr. Barker, who, along with a bank, loaned Garrett money to renovate the apartment units. Garrett was successful in renting the units to black residents and in paying back the loans. He and Barker formed a partnership investing in real estate.

In 1954, Garrett was worth $1.5 million. He proposed a deal to black businessman Joseph B. Morris, that they purchase real estate together. Morris was a graduate of UCLA who had once owned two nightclubs. Joe and his wife Cora became friends with Linda and Bernard. Together they bought the Bankers Building, the tallest building in Los Angeles. They succeeded by having Linda, whose skin was very fair, and sometimes other white faces, pretend to be the faces of their empire, appearing to run their operations while, in fact, Garrett and Morris were the owners and actual operators of the properties.

Morris and Garrett went on to purchase multiple banks and savings & loans, in Texas. They acquired their first bank in Texas in 1964 going on to buy an additional four banks and savings & loans. A racist Democratic power base eventually found a way to stop The Garretts' growing banking control of white banks in Texas. Senator John L. McClellan from Arkansas brought Garrett before the Senate Investigations Committee in 1965. The Garretts hired lawyers Melvin Belli—who had defended Jack Ruby— and Joe Tonahill to defend him. Bernard Garrett was sentenced in 1967 to a stay  at Terminal Island Federal Facility in Long Beach, California, shortly after his second daughter, Sheila, was born.

The Garretts built another real estate empire to invest in the newly independent country of the Bahamas. By 1976, they moved their family of six children to the Bahamas to run a large marina they bought, while awaiting bank charter approval to own banks in the Bahamas. The Garretts hoped to own banks in the Bahamas, until they encountered a banking charter denial because of his prior racist conviction in Texas. They eventually moved back to the United States.---45.6221

Personal life 
Bernard and Linda Garrett had six children. The couple divorced in 1977–78. Garrett went on to marry Kathy Ussery. They had two sons. Garrett died in 1999.

Bernard Garrett is the father of actress and philanthropist Cynthia Garrett and venture capitalist Christian Garrett.

Legacy 
Garrett and Morris’s 
 was adapted into the 2020 critically acclaimed film The Banker.

Garrett built a real estate and banking portfolio worth tens of millions of dollars, which equates to well over $100 million in today's dollars.

In 2020, the family established The Bernard Garrett Sr. Foundation, a public foundation focused on financial literacy and opportunity for African Americans.

References

African-American people
Civil rights movement
1925 births
1999 deaths
Burials at Inglewood Park Cemetery
20th-century African-American people